Woodville is an English surname. Notable people with this surname include the following:

Elizabeth Woodville (c. 1437–1492), queen-consort of King Edward IV of England
Catherine Woodville, Duchess of Buckingham and Bedford, otherwise Katherine Wydeville (1458–1497), sister of Elizabeth Woodville
Richard Woodville, 1st Earl Rivers (1405–1469), father of Elizabeth Woodville and Anthony Woodville
Anthony Woodville, 2nd Earl Rivers (c. 1440–1483), son of Richard Woodville
Richard Woodville, 3rd Earl Rivers (1453–1491), brother of Anthony Woodville
William Woodville (1752-1805), British physician and botanist
Richard Caton Woodville (1825–1855), American painter
Richard Caton Woodville Jr. (1856–1927), English painter, son (posthumous) of Richard Caton Woodville
Katherine Woodville (actress) (1938-2013), British film and television actress

English-language surnames
Surnames of Norman origin